The Symposium of Episcopal Conferences of Africa and Madagascar or SECAM (French: Symposium des Conférences Épiscopales d'Afrique et de Madagascar) is an agency of the Catholic Church which includes the bishops of Africa and Madagascar.

History

The SECAM was born, on the occasion of the Second Vatican Council, to express the will of the African bishops to speak and act together, overcoming the language difference, historical and cultural. The project, submitted to the Congregation for the Evangelization of Peoples, was approved in 1968. The Symposium was convened for the first time during the visit of Pope Paul VI to Uganda in 1969.

Organization
SECAM includes a presidential council, a General Secretariat, and special committees: the Committee on doctrinal and pastoral, social and legal committee, the Committee on Finance and Administration, the Committee for African Affairs, the union of African collaboration.

Presidents
 1969      - Laurean Rugambwa
 1969–1978 - Paul Zoungrana
 1978–1981 - Hyacinthe Thiandoum
 1981–1984 - Paul Zoungrana
 1984–1987 - Joseph-Albert Malula
 1987–1990 - Gabriel Gonsum Ganaka
 1991–1994 - Christian Wiyghan Tumi
 1994–1997 - Gabriel Gonsum Ganaka
 1997–2003 - Laurent Monsengwo Pasinya
 2003–2007 - John Olorunfemi Onaiyekan
 2007–2013 - Polycarp Pengo
 2013–2019 – Gabriel Mbilingi
 2019–present – Philippe Nakellentuba Ouédraogo

Members of SECAM
The regional episcopal conferences that are represented in SECAM are:
Association of Episcopal Conferences of Central Africa (Association des Conférences Episcopal de l'Afrique Centrale, ACEAC)
Association of Episcopal Conferences of Central Africa Region (Association des Conférences Episcopal de la Région de l'Afrique Central, ACERAC)
Association of Episcopal Conferences of Anglophone West Africa (Association of Episcopal Conferences of Anglophone West Africa, AECAWA)
Members of the Association of Episcopal Conferences of Eastern Africa (Association of Member Episcopal Conferences in Eastern Africa, AMECEA)
Regional Episcopal Conference of West African francophone (Episcopal Conférence Régionale de l'Afrique de l'Ouest Francophone, CERAO)
Interregional Meeting of Bishops of Southern Africa (Inter-Regional Meeting of Bishops of Southern Africa, IMBISA)
The inter-regional or national conferences of bishops:
Regional Bishops' Conference of North Africa (Regional Episcopal Conference de l'Afrique du Nord, CERNA)
Conference of Catholic Bishops of Southern Africa (Southern African Catholic Bishops' Conference, "SACBC)
Episcopal Conference of Angola and São Tomé (Conferencia Episcopal de Angola and São Tomé, CEAST)
Episcopal Conference of Burkina-Niger (Episcopal Conférence du Burkina and Niger);
Conference of Catholic Bishops of Burundi (Conférence des Bishop's catholiques du Burundi, CECA.B.)
National Episcopal Conference of Cameroon (Episcopal Conférence Nationale du Cameroun, CENC):
Central Conference of Bishops (Episcopal Conference Centrafricaine, CZECH)
Episcopal Conference of Chad, (Episcopal Conference du Tchad)
Episcopal Conference of Congo (Episcopal Conférence du Congo)
Episcopal Conference of Zaire (Episcopal Conférence du Zaire, CEZ)
Episcopal Conference of Côte d'Ivoire (Episcopal Conference of Côte d'Ivoire)
Episcopal Conference of Equatorial Guinea (Guinea Ecuatorial de Episcopal Conference)
Episcopal Conference of Ethiopia (South African Episcopal Conference)
Episcopal Conference of Gabon (Episcopal Conférence du Gabon)
Inter-territorial Conference of Catholic Bishops of Gambia and Sierra Leone (Inter-Territorial Catholic Bishops' Conference of The Gambia and Sierra Leone, ITCABIC)
Conference of Bishops of Ghana (Ghana Bishops' Conference)
Episcopal Conference of Guinea (Episcopal Conference de la Guinée)
Kenya Conference of Catholic Bishops (KCCB)
Conference of Catholic Bishops of Lesotho (Lesotho Catholic Bishops' Conference)
Episcopal Conference of Madagascar
Episcopal Conference of Malawi (Episcopal Conference of Malawi)
Episcopal Conference of Mali (Episcopal Conférence du Mali)
Episcopal Conference of Mozambique (Conferencia Episcopal de Moçambique, CEM)
Namibian Catholic Bishops' Conference (Namibian Catholic Bishops' Conference, NCBC)
Catholic Bishops Conference of Nigeria (Catholic Bishops Conference of Nigeria)
Conference of Catholic Bishops of Rwanda (Episcopal Conférence du Rwanda, C.Ep.R.)
Conference of Bishops of Senegal, Mauritania, Cape Verde, and Guinea Bissau (Conférence des Bishop's du Sénégal, de la Mauritanie, du Cap-Vert et de Guinée-Bissau)
Conference of Catholic Bishops of Sudan (Sudan Catholic Bishops' Conference, SCBC)
Episcopal Conference of Tanzania (Tanzania Episcopal Conference, TEC)
Episcopal Conference of Togo (Episcopal Conférence du Togo)
Episcopal Conference of Uganda (Uganda Episcopal Conference, UEC)
Zambia Conference of Catholic Bishops (ZCCB)
Conference of Catholic Bishops of Zimbabwe (Zimbabwe Catholic Bishops' Conference, ZCBC)
Episcopal Conference of the Indian Ocean (Conférence de l'Ocean Indien Episcopal, CEDOI)

See also
Catholic Church in Africa
Catholic Church in Madagascar

References

External links
 

1969 in Christianity
Associations of episcopal conferences
Catholic Church in Africa